Sargar may refer to:
 Sargar Dangah
 Sargar-e Lir Tahrak
 Sargar-e Sasargun